Bailando por un Sueño (literally "Dancing for a Dream"; known simply as Bailando) is an Argentine dance competition television series that premiered on 17 April 2006, on El Trece. It is the Argentine version of the Mexico series Bailando por un Sueño. The show is hosted by Marcelo Tinelli.

The format of the program changed over time. Originally, the format of the show consisted of a celebrity paired with an amateur dancer called dreamer. They had to demonstrate their skills in various styles in order to fulfill the amateur dancer's dream. Since season 5, nevertheless, the show consists of a celebrity paired with a professional dancer, representing a charity. Several dreamers of early seasons came back as professionals in later years.

Unlike other international versions, the show airs four times a week. This means the couples dance a single style per round and the whole process takes several episodes to complete.

Cast

Hosts 

Marcelo Tinelli has been the host since the program's premiere in 2006. Currently, Marcela Feudale, Raúl «Larry» DeClay, Jorge «Carna» Crivelli and Walter «Chino» D'Angelo. Accredited as announcers, these accompany Tinelli in each broadcast. They interact with Tinelli and add live comedy experiences, often adding laughter or amusing comments during the show. Using the voice-over resource.

Judging panel 

The judging panel has included several stars of the Argentine entertainment scene. For the first five seasons, it consisted of four members. In season 6, the judging panel added a member. In season 8, increased to six judges. Halfway through this season the judge Antonio Gasalla withdrew from the program, returning to there being five judges. Since the 9th season, and until now, the panel members are again four. The show also stars guest judges when the official ones are not available. From the thirteenth season, the BAR (Bailando Assistant Referee) is incorporated. Its primary function is to evaluate the technique. In the fourteenth season, his function focused more on the choreographic level than on technique.

Key
 Judge
 Guest judge(s)
 Contestant (Celebrity)
 Professional dancer 
 Choreographer
 Judge resigned
 BAR

 

Notes

Series overview

Scoring and voting procedure

The scoring begins with the judges' marks. Each judge gives a numeric score from 0 to 10. (from the season 10 onwards; previously the lowest score possible was 1). The number of judges has changed between four and six members, so the highest score has varied from 40 to 60. In each round a different judge gets the "secret score", which isn't revealed until all the couples have performed. At the end of each round, with the secret score revealed, the lowest scored couples are sent to a Duel. In the Duel, the couples must perform the same dance again and the judges will determine which couples will advance to the next round until only two couples remain. Then, the audience must vote for one of the bottom two couples via text messages. In the first three seasons, the lowest two scored couples were sent directly to the public vote.

The process is repeated several times until the final five couples are sent directly to a Duel with a new dance style. Then, The final four are divided randomly in two Semifinals where they will compete to advance to the Season Finale. In the Semifinals, three or four previously performed dances are shown again to the judges. They will cast a vote for one of the two couples. At the same time, the audience send text messages and the total is added to the judge's vote. When the final two couples are decided, the same process repeats in the Season Finale.

In the first four seasons, the show fulfilled the winner's dream. From the season 5 onwards, the winner's chosen charity receives money that varies depending on the needs.

Generally, all the celebrities help their chosen charity by featuring events to fundraise money no matter the fact if they succeed in the show or not.

General information

Withdrawals 

The first person to withdraw from competition was La Hiena Barrios in season four and José María Listorti replaced him. Later in the same season and after an injury, Catherine Fulop started crying on air stating that the judges "were being too harsh on her" and that "her efforts at dancing weren't valued enough". She never came back and Cinthia Fernández took her place only a few rounds before the Season Finale.

In season five, Ilona Staller withdrew from the competition after the first round citing a rib fracture, so Adabel Guerrero replaced her. Later, in round 24, Evangelina Anderson left the competition after dancing pregnant during several performances. Eliana Guercio replaced her, but resigned after a single performance in the show. Finally, Claudia Fernández took her place only to get eliminated after one performance.

In season six, Luciana Salazar left the competition after she got anemia, so Vanina Escudero took her place. Later, the returning Evangelina Anderson resigned to the show again citing that she missed her husband in Germany. Belén Francese, who had got eliminated in that round, was given the chance to return in the place of Evangelina.

In season seven, a total of five couples resigned to the show, making it one of the seasons where most people have quit. Mike Tyson and Pamela Anderson resigned in the first rounds stating that they couldn't travel to Argentina each time they had to perform. Jorge Luengo and Paula Chaves replaced them respectively. Later, Wanda Nara left the show after getting pregnant, being replaced by her sister Zaira the rest of the show. In round 6, Rocío Guirao fainted in the middle of her performance. She later admitted she wasn't feeling well during the rehearsals and decided to leave the show. Evangelina Anderson returned for the third time to replace her. Finally, Vanina Escudero left the show after several arguments with the judges and Sofía Pachano replaced her.

In season eight, Sergio Martínez left the competition in round 2, being replaced by Alexander Caniggia. Also, after several problems with her partner, Valeria Archimó resigned and Adabel Guerrero took her place. At last, Liz Solari left the show after receiving an offer to star in a film and Alexandra Larsson took her place.

In season nine, Paula Chaves left the show stating she wanted to spend more time with her daughter after participating in two seasons in a row. As she was participating with her husband, the production decided to pair him with the professional dancer Florencia Viterbo.

In season ten, quitting couples are automatically eliminated and don't receive a replacement. Former winner Anita Martínez left the show stating problems with her partner. Later, Negro Álvarez decided to leave saying that the "format of the show wasn't for him". Finally, former winner and judge, Carmen Barbieri resigned to the show for the third time in a row after quitting in seasons five and six as a judge.

In season eleven, producers decided to continue with previous season politic to not replace withdrawn couples. However, they were forced to do so later in the show because this was the season where most celebrities resigned. Before the show started in 30 May, Bárbara Vélez announced she wouldn't participate after an alleged scandal of domestic violence against her by her ex-boyfriend, Federico Bal, winner of season ten, who would also participate in the show. In round 2, singer Alejandro Lerner left the show alleging that he was "too busy preparing his new album" and couldn't attend to the rehearsals. One rund after that, Fabián Doman resigned to the show because he "felt he couldn't give much more to the show", saying that he wasn't good at dancing at all. In round 6, Martín Liberman left the show because he "wasn't feeling happy with the jury's treatment over him". Finally, Agustín Casanova and his producer Fernando Vázquez both resigned to the show to tour the country with his respective bands in round 9. After this, producers decided to include new celebrities in order to replace the ones who had resigned. Carla Conte, winner of season three; Anita Martínez and Bicho Gómez, winners of season nine, Nicole Neumann and Lizy Tagliani were the chosen ones to replace quitting couples. Alongside, Bárbara Vélez decided to return to the competition.

Disqualifications 

In season eleven, producers decided to disqualify singer Marta Sánchez after she didn't show up to the show the day she had to perform.

References

External links
  El Trece's Showmatch website

 
Argentine variety television shows
2006 Argentine television series debuts
El Trece original programming
Non-British television series based on British television series